Eydie Gormé (born Edith Gormezano; August 16, 1928 – August 10, 2013) was an American singer who had hits on the pop and Latin pop charts. She sang solo and in the duo Steve and Eydie with her husband, Steve Lawrence, on albums and television. She also performed on Broadway and in Las Vegas.

Early years
Gormé was born in the Bronx to Sephardic Jewish parents Nessim Hasdai Gormezano and Fortuna "Fortunee" Gormezano. Both her parents were born in Turkey. The Gormezanos spoke several languages at home, including Ladino (also referred to as Judaeo-Spanish). Due to its close relationship with Castilian Spanish, Gormé was able to speak and sing in Spanish. She was distantly related (by marriage) to Neil Sedaka. After graduating from William Howard Taft High School, which she attended with Stanley Kubrick, Gormé found a job as a translator. At night she studied at City College.  On weekends she sang in a band led by Ken Greengrass.

Career
She appeared on the Spanish-language radio program Cita Con Eydie (A Date with Eydie), changing her name from "Edith" to "Edie" and then "Eydie" because people mispronounced "Edie". She considered changing her last name, but her mother told her, "It's bad enough that you're in show business. How will the neighbors know if you're ever a success?"

Gormé sang with the Tommy Tucker band for two months in 1950, followed by a year with Tex Beneke's band. She signed as a solo act with Coral Records in 1952 and released her first single, "That Night of Heaven". She was hired by The Tonight Show in its early days with Steve Allen and formed a duo with another one of its staff singers, Steve Lawrence. As The Tonight Show was beginning to broadcast across the country in 1954, the duo released their first single, "Make Yourself Comfortable/I've Gotta Crow".

Gormé had her first chart hit, "Too Close for Comfort", in 1956 after moving from Coral to ABC-Paramount Records. Two more hits followed. "Mama, Teach Me to Dance" and "Love Me Forever" reached the Top 40 singles chart while her albums Eydie Gorme and Eydie Swings the Blues reached the Top 20 albums chart.

In 1957, Gormé and Lawrence were married, and several months later they hosted Steve Allen Presents the Steve Lawrence-Eydie Gormé Show after Allen retired from The Tonight Show. Three more singles by Gormé and two more albums became chart hits. In 1960 they sang in clubs and released We Got Us, their first album as a duo. They received a Grammy Award for Best Performance by a Vocal Group for the title track from the album. Gormé recorded "Yes My Darling Daughter" for Columbia Records, and it reached the Top Ten in  the UK.  

In 1963, she reached the Top Ten in the U.S. with "Blame It on the Bossa Nova". The song earned her a Grammy Award nomination for Best Female Vocal Performance and was certified gold after selling one million copies.  The album Blame It on the Bossa Nova entered the Top 40 with four more hit singles during the same year. Two were recorded as the duo Steve & Eydie. She recorded the Spanish albums Amor and More Amor with the Trio Los Panchos. Then she turned to show tunes. "If He Walked Into My Life" was an Easy Listening hit in 1966 and earned her a Grammy Award for Best Female Pop Vocal Performance.

Steve and Eydie moved on to Broadway, starring in the musical Golden Rainbow based on the play A Hole in the Head. "How Could I Be So Wrong" by Gormé, which was performed in the musical, was a hit on the Easy Listening chart. The musical had a successful one-year run. Steve and Eydie signed to RCA Victor and released a pair of albums while Gormé had another hit with the title track and album Tonight I'll Say a Prayer in 1970. Their last hit on the pop chart was the song "We Can Make It Together" with the Osmonds in 1973.

Gormé was successful in the Latin music market and internationally through albums she recorded in Spanish with the Trio Los Panchos. Her first recording with Los Panchos came about after the popular group with members from Mexico and Puerto Rico, composed of Alfredo Gil, Chucho Navarro, and Johnny Albino, saw her perform at Manhattan's Club Copacabana late in 1963. Gormé had achieved international fame from the song "Blame it on the Bossa Nova", which sold 250,000 copies in Spanish in addition to sales in English. Los Panchos were the top bolero singers in Latin America, so when they suggested a recording Columbia agreed.

In 1964, Columbia released the album Amor, which spent 22 weeks on the charts. The song "Sabor a Mí" became one of Gormé's signature tunes. In 1965, a sequel appeared called More Amor, later reissued as Cuatro Vidas. Her last album with Los Panchos was Navidad Means Christmas (1966), later reissued as Blanca Navidad. She recorded other Spanish albums in her career, including the Grammy-nominated La Gormé (1976). Muy Amigos/Close Friends (1977), a duet collection with Puerto Rican singer Danny Rivera, also received a Grammy nomination.

Steve and Eydie performed a tribute to George Gershwin on their television special Our Love Is Here to Stay, which won an Emmy Award for Outstanding Variety Music or Comedy Special. Two years later they sang on Steve and Eydie Celebrate Irving Berlin and again won an Emmy Award for Outstanding Variety Music or Comedy Special. In 1989 they started the record label GL Music. They sang with Frank Sinatra on his seventieth-birthday tour and on his album Duets II (1994). They recorded a cover version of the song "Black Hole Sun" by the rock band Soundgarden for the album Lounge-A-Palooza (1997).

As the twenty-first century arrived, the couple announced plans to reduce their touring, starting a One More for the Road Tour in 2002. In 2006, Gormé became a blogger. In November 2009, after his wife retired, Lawrence embarked on a solo music tour.

Personal life
Gormé and Lawrence had two sons. David Nessim Lawrence (b. 1960) is an ASCAP Award-winning composer who composed the score for High School Musical. Michael Robert Lawrence (1962-1986) died at the age of 23 of ventricular fibrillation from an undiagnosed heart condition.

Gormé and Lawrence were in Atlanta, Georgia at the time of their son's death, having performed at the Fox Theater the night before. Frank Sinatra, a family friend, sent his private plane to fly the couple to New York where David had been attending school. After their son's death, Gormé and Lawrence suspended touring for a year.

Death
Gormé died on August 10, 2013, six days before her 85th birthday, at Sunrise Hospital & Medical Center in Las Vegas after a brief, undisclosed illness. She was interred at Hillside Memorial Park in Los Angeles, California.

Lawrence issued a statement: "Eydie has been my partner on stage and in my life for more than 55 years. I fell in love with her the moment I saw her and even more the first time I heard her sing. While my personal loss is unimaginable, the world has lost one of the greatest pop vocalists of all time."

Awards and honors
 Grammy Award for Best Performance by a Vocal Group, We Got Us with Steve Lawrence, 1960
 Grammy Award for Best Female Vocal Performance, "If He Walked Into My Life", 1966
 Society of Singers Lifetime Achievement Award, 1995
 Inducted with Steve Lawrence into the  Songwriters Hall of Fame, winning the Sammy Cahn Lifetime Achievement Award, 1995
 Emmy Award for Outstanding Variety Music or Comedy Special, Our Love Is Here to Stay with Steve Lawrence, 1976
 Emmy Award for Outstanding Variety Music or Comedy Special, Steve and Eydie Celebrate Irving Berlin with Steve Lawrence, 1979

Discography

Albums
Solo
 Delight (1956)
 Eydie Gorme (1957)
 Eydie Swings the Blues (1957)
 Eydie Gorme Vamps the Roaring 20's (1958)
 Eydie in Love (1958)
 Gorme Sings Showstoppers (1958)
 Love Is a Season (1958)
 Eydie Gorme on Stage (1959)
 Eydie in Dixieland (1959)
 Come Sing with Me (1961)
 I Feel So Spanish (1961)
 Very Best of Eydie Gorme (1961)
 Best of Eydie Gorme (1962)
 Blame It on the Bossa Nova (1963)
 Let the Good Times Roll (1963)
 Gorme Country Style (1964)
 Great Songs from 'The Sound of Music' & Broadway (1965)
 Don't Go to Strangers (1966)
 Softly, as I Leave You (1967)
 The Look of Love (1968)
 Eydie (1968)
 Yes Indeed! (1969) Harmony
 With All My Heart (1969) Harmony
 Otra Vez (1969)
 Melodies of Love (1970) Harmony
 Tonight I'll Say a Prayer (1970)
 If He Walked into My Life (1971) Harmony
 It Was a Good Time (1971)
 La Gorme (1976)
 Muy Amigos/Close Friends with Danny Rivera (1977)
 Since I Fell for You (1981)
 Tomame O Dejame (1982)
 De Corazon a Corazon (1988)
 Eso Es El Amor (1992)
 Silver Screen (1992)
 Blame It on the Bossa Nova (+ 2 bonus tracks) (2002)
 Tonight I'll Say a Prayer/It Was a Good Time (2005)
 Don't Go to Strangers/Softly as I Leave You (2012)
 Since I Fell for You (+ 5 bonus tracks) (2014)
 An American Treasure (2015)

With Steve Lawrence
 Steve & Eydie (1958)
 We Got Us (1960)
 Sing the Golden Hits (1960)
 Our Best to You (1961)
 Cozy (1961)
 Two on the Aisle (1962)
 Steve & Eydie at the Movies (1963)
 That Holiday Feeling (1964)
 Steve & Eydie Together on Broadway (1967)
 Bonfa & Brazil with Luis Bonfa (1967)
 Golden Rainbow (1968)
 Real True Lovin'  (1969)
 What It Was, Was Love (1969)
 A Man and a Woman (1970)
 This Is Steve & Eydie (1971)
 This Is Steve & Eydie, Vol. 2 (1972)
 The World of Steve & Eydie (1972)(2009)
 Feelin'  (1972)
 Songs by Steve & Eydie (1972)
 Steve & Eydie Together (1975)
 Our Love Is Here to Stay (1976)
 Together Forever(1984)
 Hallelujah (1984)
 Through the Years (1985)
 Alone Together (1990)
 Happy Holidays (1990)
 Steve & Eydie and Friends Celebrate Gershwin (1990)
 Steve & Eydie and Friends Celebrate Porter (1990)
 Steve & Eydie and Friends Celebrate Berlin (1990)
 Together on Broadway/Two on the Isle (2001)
 To You from Us (2009)
 Cozy/A Man & a Woman (2013)
 Cozy/Two on the Isle (2013)
With Trio Los Panchos
 Amor (1964)
 More Amor (1965)
 Navidad Means Christmas (1966)
 Canta en Español (1970)
 Cuatro Vidas (1970)

Singles

Music samples

References

External links
Official site
2003 Interview with Larry King

1928 births
2013 deaths
American people of Italian-Jewish descent
American people of Italian descent
American people of Lebanese-Jewish descent
American people of Turkish-Jewish descent
American performers of Latin music
American women pop singers
American Sephardic Jews
20th-century Sephardi Jews
Burials at Hillside Memorial Park Cemetery
ABC Records artists
Columbia Records artists
MGM Records artists
Grammy Award winners
Jewish American musicians
Jewish singers
People from the Bronx
Primetime Emmy Award winners
Singers from New York City
Spanish-language singers of the United States
Torch singers
Traditional pop music singers
21st-century American Jews
Women in Latin music
21st-century American women